Beauty and the Beast (also known as Blood of Beasts) is a 2005 film which is based on the folktale "Beauty and the Beast" and is set during the time of the Vikings.

Plot
Thorsson the king is falling ill and wants to make a pilgrimage to an island cursed by Odin. The island is home to a horrible beast. His daughter, Freya is betrothed to Sven one of Thorsson's greatest warriors.

Freya tries to get an army together to go back and save her father, Thorsson (whom she believes to be alive) however, no one will join her, and Sven reminds her that he is now king and that she is betrothed to him. Freya and Ingrid go to the island alone to rescue her father, Thorsson.

Eric steps forward and tells everyone they've all been acting like cowards. He also says he'll go and save the king's daughter himself if Sven does not dare. Sven who is unwilling to look like a coward, angrily agrees to send an army back to fight the beast and rescue Freya.

Freya and the Beast begin to develop a friendship. Sven returns to the island with an army and confronts the Beast. Freya tries to stop them, by telling them the beast is not a monster. Sven does not listen to her, thinking the Beast has fooled her mind. Sven and the Beast fight and ends with Sven's archers shooting him. The warriors set the island afire and return home with Freya.

The Beast journeys to Freya's home where Thorsson has recovered from his illness and is once again king. As the Beast holds the dying Freya in his arms, Freya's sacrifice breaks the curse and the Beast is Agnar once again.

Cast
 Jane March as Freya
 William Gregory Lee as Sven
 Justin Whalin as Eric
 David Dukas as Agnar/Beast
 Greg Melvill-Smith as Thorsson
 Candîce Hillebrand as Ingrid

Production
The movie was filmed in both the United Kingdom and South Africa.

Reception 
Scott Weinberg of DVDTalk notes that the DVD cover misleadingly looks like Lord of the Rings, and not "the Halloween-costumed lunatic combination of Beauty and the Beast and The 13th Warrior that it so painfully is."
He says the film manages to be "so bad it's good" and suggests catching it on cable television, and concludes "But don't mistake that opinion for a hearty recommendation".

References

External links
 
 
 

2005 films
2005 fantasy films
2000s fantasy adventure films
2000s monster movies
2000s romantic fantasy films
British fantasy adventure films
British monster movies
British romantic fantasy films
2000s English-language films
English-language South African films
Films based on Beauty and the Beast
Films set in the Viking Age
South African adventure films
South African romance films
Sword and sorcery films
Films directed by David Lister
2000s British films